Želva is an album from 1968 from the Czech band Olympic, published by Supraphon. Its catalogue numbers are 1 13 0412 (stereo), 0 13 0412 (mono). The cover shows a drawn turtle. It was later published with uniformed covers.

Track listing

Side A
 Želva (Petr Janda/Pavel Chrastina) - 3:38
 Vzpomínka plíživá (Ladislav Klein-Zdeněk Rytíř) - 2:47
 Línej skaut (Petr Janda/Pavel Chrastina) - 2:12
 Dám zejtra zas flám (Petr Janda/Pavel Chrastina) - 2:26
 Modravé mámení (Petr Janda/Pavel Chrastina) - 2:18
 Nikdo neotvírá (Petr Janda/Pavel Chrastina) - 2:07

Side B
 Nebezpečná postava (Petr Janda/František Ringo Čech) - 1:42
 Snad jsem to zavinil já (Petr Janda/Pavel Chrastina) - 3:04
 Dědečkův duch (Petr Janda/Pavel Chrastina) - 2:18
 Jen Bůh ví (Petr Janda/Pavel Chrastina) - 3:35
 Telefon (Petr Janda/Pavel Chrastina) - 1:47
 Psychiatrický prášek (Petr Janda/Pavel Chrastina) - 6:21

References

External links
 Rateyourmusic.com

Olympic (band) albums
1968 albums